Edward Thomas Barry (October 12, 1919 – February 12, 2016) was an American professional ice hockey player. Barry also played for the Boston Olympics of the Eastern Hockey League and the Boston Bruins, and later became the coach at Boston State College. He was inducted into the Northeastern University athletics Hall of Fame in 1976, and the University of Massachusetts Boston Hall of Fame in 2003.

Playing career
Born in 1919, Barry learned to play hockey in his hometown of Wellesley, Massachusetts. He played briefly for Northeastern University in Boston, but left school during his freshman year in the winter of 1940 to skate for the Boston Olympics of the Eastern Hockey League from 1941 to 1943, captaining the team in 1941 and 1942.

Following a brief tour of duty in the Coast Guard during World War II era, when he played for the United States Coast Guard Cutters, Barry returned to play for the Boston Bruins for 19 games during the 1946–47 season, making him the first American to play for the Bruins since the 1920s. He rejoined the Olympics for four more seasons before becoming head coach in 1950. During his two seasons as coach, Barry went 63-51-7. Barry was the head coach at Boston State College (now part of UMass Boston) from 1962 to 1982 and guided them to two ECAC Division II Tournaments and two NAIA tournaments. In 1965, BSC went 20–0. He was also a referee for several national collegiate championship games.

As a golfer, Barry won 12 club championships at the Charles River Country Club, Newton, the New England Amateur championship, and New England and Massachusetts Senior Amateur titles. He is honored by a bronze plaque in front of the clubhouse. After leaving the Bruins, Barry went into the insurance business and became a partner at Barry and Farrell Insurance Agency in Needham, Massachusetts, where his son and grandchildren now work. He died on February 12, 2016.

Career statistics

Regular season and playoffs

References

External links

1919 births
2016 deaths
American men's ice hockey left wingers
Boston Bruins players
Boston Olympics players
Ice hockey players from Massachusetts
Northeastern Huskies men's ice hockey players
People from Wellesley, Massachusetts
United States Coast Guard Cutters players
United States Coast Guard enlisted
United States Coast Guard personnel of World War II